The African dwarf mud turtle (Pelusios nanus) is a species of turtle in the family Pelomedusidae. It is endemic to Africa : in Angola, the Democratic Republic of the Congo, Malawi, and Zambia. These mud turtles are the smallest of all African turtle species, “Nanus” which they are referred to are one of the 3 smallest turtle species in the world. The other two are Stink Pot Musk and Muhlenberg's Bog Turtles. All 3 species barely reach 4 inches as full grown adults. Like many of the world's chelonians, Pelusios castaneus has the potential to live a long life. Reports typically suggest more than 50 years in captivity for this species.

References

Bibliography 

 
 

African dwarf mud turtle
Reptiles of Central Africa
Reptiles of Angola
Reptiles of the Democratic Republic of the Congo
Reptiles of Malawi
Reptiles of Zambia
African dwarf mud turtle